26th London Film Critics Circle Awards
8 February 2006

Film of the Year: 
 Brokeback Mountain 

British Film of the Year: 
 The Constant Gardener 

The 26th London Film Critics Circle Awards, honouring the best in film for 2005, were announced by the London Film Critics Circle on 8 February 2006.

Winners and nominees

Film of the Year
 Brokeback Mountain 
The Constant Gardener
Crash
A History of Violence
King Kong

British Film of the Year
 The Constant Gardener 
The Descent
Mrs Henderson Presents
Pride & Prejudice
Wallace & Gromit: The Curse of the Were-Rabbit

Foreign Language Film of the Year
 Downfall • Germany
The Beat that My Heart Skipped • France
Caché • Austria/France
The Chorus • France
The Sea Inside • Spain

Director of the Year
Ang Lee – Brokeback Mountain 
David Cronenberg – A History of Violence
Paul Haggis – Crash
Peter Jackson – King Kong
Fernando Meirelles – The Constant Gardener

British Director of the Year
Joe Wright – Pride & Prejudice 
Stephen Frears – Mrs Henderson Presents
Terry George – Hotel Rwanda
Neil Marshall – The Descent
Christopher Nolan – Batman Begins

Screenwriter of the Year
Paul Haggis and Robert Moresco – Crash 
Larry McMurtry and Diana Ossana – Brokeback Mountain
Jeffrey Caine – The Constant Gardener
Bernd Eichinger – Downfall
Shane Black – Kiss Kiss Bang Bang

Actor of the Year
Bruno Ganz – Downfall 
Don Cheadle- Hotel Rwanda
Johnny Depp – Charlie and the Chocolate Factory
Heath Ledger – Brokeback Mountain
Viggo Mortensen – A History of Violence

Actress of the Year
 Naomi Watts – King Kong 
Maria Bello – A History of Violence
Juliette Binoche – Caché
Laura Linney – Kinsey
Catalina Sandino Moreno – Maria Full of Grace

British Actor of the Year
 Ralph Fiennes – The Constant Gardener 
Christian Bale – The Machinist
Chiwetel Ejiofor – Kinky Boots
Liam Neeson – Kinsey
Tom Wilkinson – Separate Lies

British Actress of the Year
 Rachel Weisz – The Constant Gardener 
Judi Dench – Mrs Henderson Presents
Keira Knightley – Pride & Prejudice
Kristin Scott Thomas – Keeping Mum
Emily Watson – Separate Lies

British Supporting Actor of the Year
 Tom Hollander – Pride & Prejudice 
Paddy Considine – Cinderella Man
Brendan Gleeson – Harry Potter and the Goblet of Fire
James McAvoy – The Chronicles of Narnia: The Lion, the Witch and the Wardrobe
Cillian Murphy – Batman Begins

British Supporting Actress of the Year
 Thandie Newton – Crash 
Brenda Blethyn- Pride & Prejudice
Sophie Okonedo – Hotel Rwanda
Rosamund Pike – Pride & Prejudice
Tilda Swinton – The Chronicles of Narnia: The Lion, the Witch and the Wardrobe

British Newcomer of the Year
 Kelly Reilly – Mrs Henderson Presents 
Julian Fellowes – Separate Lies
Annie Griffin – Festival
Matthew Macfadyen – Pride & Prejudice
Joe Wright – Pride & Prejudice

British Producer of the Year
 Simon Channing-Williams – The Constant Gardener 
Marc Boothe, Ruth Caleb – Bullet Boy
Andrew Eaton, Michael Winterbottom – A Cock and Bull Story
Christian Colson – Separate Lies
Peter Lord – Wallace & Gromit: The Curse of the Were-Rabbit

Dilys Powell Award
Bryan Forbes

References

2
2005 film awards
2005 in London
2005 in British cinema